Inga Clendinnen,  (17 August 1934 – 8 September 2016) was an Australian author, historian, anthropologist, and academic. Her work focused on social history, and the history of cultural encounters. She was an authority on Aztec civilisation and pre-Columbian ritual human sacrifice. She also wrote about the Holocaust and on first contacts between Indigenous Australians and white explorers. At her death, she was an Emeritus Scholar at La Trobe University, Melbourne.

Early life and education
Clendinnen was born in Geelong, Victoria, in 1934. She was the youngest of four children. Her father owned a cabinet-making business and later became a Geelong City Councillor; her mother was a homemaker. Clendinnen graduated from the University of Melbourne in 1955 with a Bachelor of Arts with Honours, followed by a Master of Arts in 1975.

Career
Clendinnen's work focused on social history, and the history of cultural encounters. She was considered an authority on Aztec civilisation and pre-Columbian ritual human sacrifice. She also wrote on the Holocaust, and on first contacts between Indigenous Australians and white explorers.

Clendinnen held the post of senior tutor of History at the University of Melbourne from 1955 to 1968, was a lecturer at La Trobe University from 1969 to 1982, and was then a senior lecturer in History until 1989. Forced to curtail her academic activities after contracting hepatitis in 1991, Clendinnen began working on her memoir, Tiger's Eye, which focused on issues of illness and death. She retained an association with La Trobe University, however, as she was appointed Emeritus Scholar.

In 1999, she was invited to present the 40th annual Boyer Lectures. The ideas presented in these lectures, concerning first contacts in Australia, were later published as True Stories.

In the Australia Day 2006 Honours List, Clendinnen was appointed an Officer of the Order of Australia (AO), with a citation that read:

Clendinnen's AO award was noted and a motion paying tribute to her contributions was passed, in the proceedings of the New South Wales State Parliament's Upper House.

Personal life and death 
Clendinnen married the philosopher of science John Clendinnen in 1955, and had two children with him. Clendinnen died on 8 September 2016 after a short illness.

Awards and nominations
 1988 – received the Herbert Eugene Bolton Memorial Prize for Ambivalent Conquests
 1999 – winner of the NSW History Awards, Premier's General History Prize for Reading the Holocaust
1999 – winner of the National Jewish Book Award in the Holocaust category for Reading the Holocaust
 1999 – Reading the Holocaust was judged Best Book of the Year by The New York Times
 2000 – New South Wales Premier's Literary Awards, Gleebooks Prize for Critical Writing for Reading the Holocaust
 2002 – received the Adelaide Festival Award for Innovation for Tiger's Eye
 2003 – received the New South Wales Premier's History Award for her piece "History Here: a Vier from Outside"
 2004 – New South Wales Premier's Literary Awards, Douglas Stewart Prize for Non-fiction for Dancing with Strangers
 2005 – recipient of the ASA (Australian Society of Authors) biennial medal
 2006 – Appointed Officer of the Order of Australia for her services as a writer and historian.
 2007 – received the Philip Hodgins Memorial Medal
 2016 – Dan David Prize

Bibliography

Books

 Ambivalent Conquests: Maya and Spaniard in Yucatán, 1517–1570 (1987)
Aztecs: An Interpretation (1991)
Reading the Holocaust (1998)
True Stories (1999)
Tiger's Eye: A Memoir (2000)
Dancing with Strangers: Europeans and Australians at First Contact (2003)
True Stories: History, Politics, Aboriginality (2008) (2nd ed.)
The Cost of Courage in Aztec Society: Essays on Mesoamerican Society and Culture (2010)

Essays and Essay Collections 

 Agamemnon's Kiss: Selected Essays (2006)
 "The History Question: Who Owns the Past?" (2006) (from the 23rd edition of Quarterly Essay)

Articles
 
  Review of

References

External links
 Australian Biography Online
 1999 Boyer Lectures by Inga Clendinnen

1934 births
2016 deaths
Australian historians
Academics from Melbourne
Officers of the Order of Australia
Australian memoirists
Australian Mesoamericanists
Women Mesoamericanists
Historians of Mesoamerica
Aztec scholars
Mayanists
20th-century Mesoamericanists
University of Melbourne alumni
Australian women memoirists
20th-century Australian women writers
20th-century Australian writers
Fellows of the Australian Academy of the Humanities
21st-century Mesoamericanists
21st-century Australian women writers
21st-century Australian writers
University of Melbourne women
Australian women historians